The statuette of The Shouting Horseman was made by the sculptor Andrea Riccio (1470-1532).  It is in the collection of the Victoria and Albert Museum in London.

The statuette shows a warrior wearing classical armour and  riding bare-back, crying out in the heat of battle. In his right hand, he holds the hilt of a sword (the blade is missing).  The warrior's left hand may have originally held a spear or shield.

Bronze sculptures were usually made so that they can be reproduced in several versions, but the Lost-wax casting method of casting used by Riccio makes this horse and rider unique.

Bibliography

Sculptures of the Victoria and Albert Museum
Bronzeware
Equestrian statues in the United Kingdom
16th-century sculptures
Bronze sculptures in the United Kingdom